Polka Album is a collection of Polka songs recorded by Bobby Vinton, released in 1981. It is an edited version of his studio album Party Music ~~ 20 Hits.

Track listing

Side 1
 Ob-La-Di, Ob-La-Da - (John Lennon, Paul McCartney) - 2:33
 Just Because - (Bob Shelton, Joe Shelton, Sydney Robin) - 2:13
 You Are My Sunshine - (Jimmie Davis, Charles Mitchell) - 2:29
 Tic-Tock Polka - (S. Guski, R.J. Martino, Gaetana Lama) - 2:07
 Strike Up the Band for Love - (Bobby Vinton, Gene Allan) - 2:19
 Paloma Blanca - (Hans Bouwens) - 3:17

Side 2
 Pennsylvania Polka - (Lester Lee, Zeke Manners) - 1:55
 Too Fat Polka - (R.A. MacLean, Arthur Richardson) - 2:28
 Hoop-Dee-Doo - (Frank Loesser, Milton DeLugg) - 1:55
 That's Amoré - (Jack Brooks, Harry Warren) - 2:32
 Don't Let My Mary Go Around - (Bobby Vinton, Gene Allan) - 2:22
 Polka Memories Medley (Polka Doll/That's My Family Tree/I Love to Dance the Polka/Moja Dziewczyna Myje Nogi/Memories of Old/Love Is a Melody That Lasts Forever) - (original lyrics and adaptation by Bobby Vinton) - 4:53

Album credits
Produced by Bob Morgan for Rexford Productions, Inc.
Engineering by Ron Malo

1981 compilation albums
Bobby Vinton compilation albums